François Emmanuel Joseph Bazin (4 September 1816 – 2 July 1878) was a well-known French opera composer during the nineteenth century.

Biography
Born in Marseille, Bazin was a student of Daniel Auber at the Conservatoire de Paris. After completing his education there and returning from his trip to Italy in 1844, Bazin later taught harmony at the Conservatoire. He was succeeded by his own student Émile Durand.

At age 23, Bazin's cantata Loyse de Monfort won the 1840 Prix de Rome. Le Voyage en Chine, which premiered at the Opéra-Comique in Paris, is his best-known composition, and continued to be staged well into the 20th century. Although his many light operas were popular during his lifetime, they are rarely staged today. A handful of arias are still occasionally performed, including "Je pense à vous" from Maître Pathelin, recorded by Roberto Alagna.

Bazin died at age 61 in Paris.

Works

Opéra-comique
Le Trompette de Monsieur le Prince (Joubert and Melesville), 1846
Le Malheur d'être jolie (Desnoyers), 1847
La Nuit de la Saint-Sylvestre (Mélesville and M. Masson), 1849
Madelon (Sauvage), 1852
Maître Pathelin (de Leuven and Langlé), 1856
Les Désespérés (de Leuven and Langlé), 1858
Marianne (Challamel) (unperformed)
Le Voyage en Chine (Alfred Delacour and Eugène Labiche), 1865
L'Ours et le pacha (Scribe and Saintine/J. X. Boniface), 1870

Bibliography
 David Charlton, "Bazin, François (Emmanuel-Joseph)", in: Sadie, Stanley (ed.), The New Grove Dictionary of Opera, vol. 1 (A–D) (New York: MacMillan, 1994), .

External links

See also

For Bazin's other pupils, .

1816 births
1878 deaths
19th-century classical composers
19th-century French composers
19th-century French male musicians
Academic staff of the Conservatoire de Paris
Burials at Père Lachaise Cemetery
Chevaliers of the Légion d'honneur
Conservatoire de Paris alumni
French male classical composers
French opera composers
French operetta composers
French Romantic composers
Male opera composers
Musicians from Marseille
Pupils of Fromental Halévy
Prix de Rome for composition
Occitan musicians